The current Constitution of the Cayman Islands, the fourth written constitution for the Cayman Islands since 1959, was established by "The Cayman Islands Constitution Order 2009" of 10 June 2009, and came into force on 4 November 2009, by a proclamation published by the governor of the Cayman Islands. It was amended by "The Cayman Islands Constitution (Amendment) Order 2016" of 13 July 2016, which came into force by a similar proclamation.

External links 

 Cayman Islands Constitution Order

References 

Cayman Islands
Politics of the Cayman Islands
Caymanian law
Cayman Islands